was a Japanese actor who appeared in films of Akira Kurosawa, Yasujirō Ozu, Mikio Naruse, Tadashi Imai and many others. He succumbed to lung cancer at the age of 71.

Distinctions
One of Kurosawa's iconic Seven Samurai, Miyaguchi won the 1955 Mainichi Film Concours Best Supporting Actor award for his role.

In 1983 he was awarded Japan's Medal with Purple Ribbon.

A character designed as a caricature of Miyaguchi is regularly featured in the cat-oriented manga Mon-chan and Me, published in Fusosha's popular webzine Joshi Spa! (Women's Spa!).

Selected filmography

1945: Sanshiro Sugata Part II - Kohei Tsuzaki
1946: Urashima Tarô no kôei
1947: Sanbon yubi no otoko
1951: The Good Fairy - Editor-in-chief
1951: Early Summer - Nishiwaki
1951: Fireworks over the Sea  - Gunzô Ishiguro
1951: Inochi uruwashi - Oshima
1952: Ikiru - Yakuza Boss
1953: The Last Embrace - Gangster
1953: Senkan Yamato
1953: An Inlet of Muddy Water - Gen Shichi (Story 3)
1954: Seven Samurai - Kyuzo, the master swordsman
1954: Taiyo no nai machi
1955: Izumi e no michi
1956: Kyatsu o nigasuna
1956: Flowing
1956: Ankokugai
1956: Shokei no heya - Hanya, Katsumi's father
1956: Onibi
1956: Aru onna no baai - Tomoki Hisamoto
1956: Nagareru - Namie's uncle
1957: Throne of Blood - Phantom samurai
1957: Tokyo Twilight - Policeman
1957: Aruse
1957: Nikui mono
1957: Yoru no chô - Customer
1957: Kiken na eiyu
1957: Jun'ai monogatari - Judge
1957: Kuroi kawa - Kin
1958: Stakeout - Yuji Shimooka, the police detective
1958: Kuroi kafun - Kitaga
1958: Rickshaw Man - Fencing master
1958: The Ballad of Narayama - Mata-yan
1958: Ryu ni makasero
1958: Nemuri Kyôshirô burai hikae: Maken jigoku - Senjuro Takebe
1959: The Human Condition - Kyôritsu Ô
1959: Saikô shukun fujin - Rintaro Nonomiya
1959: Kiku to Isamu - Doctor
1959: Farewell to Spring - Akira's father
1959: Aruhi watashi wa - Masao Shiroyama
1959: Mikkai
1959: Jôen - Ôshû Mitani
1960: Banana
1960: Bokutô kitan - Yoshizo
1960: The Bad Sleep Well - Prosecutor Okakura
1960: Minagoroshi no uta' yori kenjû-yo saraba! - Takahashi
1961: Enraptured - Prof. Nunokawa
1961: Miyamoto Musashi - Bamboo craftsman Kisuke
1961: Aitsu to watashi - Kokichi, Saburo's father
1961: Kuroi gashû dainibu: Kanryû1962: Karami-ai1962: The Outcast - School master
1962: Miyamoto Musashi: Showdown at Hannyazaka Heights - Bamboo craftsman Kisuke
1962: Gekkyû dorobo 
1963: Attack Squadron!1963: Koto - Takichiro Sada
1963: Mushukunin-betsuchô - Usuke
1963: Subarashii akujo1963: Alibi - Asakichi Sagawa
1963: Mashiroki Fuji no ne - Shûhei Isomura
1963: Gobanchô yûgirirô - Sanzaemon
1963: Mother - Doctor
1963: Hikaru umi - Seiji Tajima
1964: Kaze no bushi1964: Pale Flower - Gang leader
1964: Nihiki no mesu inu - Detective Tasaka
1964: Samurai from Nowhere - Tatewaki Komuro
1964: Unholy Desire - Genji Miyata
1964: Hadaka no jûyaku - Heikichi Hamanaka
1964: Akujo - Daizo Suzuki
1964: Ai to shi o mitsumete 
1964: Kuruwa sodachi - Tsukada
1964: Kwaidan - Old man (segment "Chawan no naka")
1964: Kenji Kirishima Saburô - Masayuki Mori
1965: Gulliver's Travels Beyond the Moon - Prof. Gulliver (voice)
1965: Miseinen - Zoku cupola no aru machi - Tatsugorô Ishiguro
1965: Samurai Spy - Jinnai-Kazutaka Horikawa
1966: Panchi yarô - Wada's Father
1967: Taifû to zakuro - Naokichi Kuwata
1967: Chikumagawa zesshô1967: Japan's Longest Day - Foreign Minister Shigenori Togo
1968: Shachô hanjôki 
1968: Zoku shacho hanjôki1968: Rio no wakadaishô 
1968: Rengô kantai shirei chôkan: Yamamoto Isoroku - Ito
1968: Aniki no koibito - Ginsaku Kitagawa
1970: The Militarists - Foreign Minister Shigenori Togo
1971: To Love Again - Miya's father
1972: Tora-san's Dear Old Home - Utako's father
1974: The Fossil - Sunami
1974: Tora-san's Lovesick - Utako's father
1975: Aoi sanmyaku
1977: Melodii beloy nochi
1980: Tobe ikarosu no tsubasa - Miwa
1980: Shōgun (TV Mini-Series)  - Muraji
1982: The Challenge - Old Man
1982: Maboroshi no mizuumi - Yoshikane Nagao
1983: Hakujasho - Jikan
1984: Ningyo densetsu - Tatsuo
1984: Farewell to the Ark - Old man
1986: Oedipus no yaiba - Yoshiyama (final film role)

Selected television appearances
1965: Taikōki - Manase Dōsan
1972: Shin Heike Monogatari - Fujiwara no Shunzei
1976: Kaze to Kumo to Niji to - Musashi no Takeshiba
1979: Oretachi wa Tenshi da! (1979) Episode14
1983: Tokugawa Ieyasu - Torii Tadayoshi
1984: Sanga Moyu -  Ichirō Kiyose

References

External links
 
 

1913 births
1985 deaths
Male actors from Tokyo
20th-century Japanese male actors
Japanese male film actors
Japanese male television actors
Japanese male stage actors
Recipients of the Medal with Purple Ribbon
Deaths from lung cancer in Japan